The 1990 English cricket season was the 91st in which the County Championship had been an official competition. The size of the seam on the cricket ball had been reduced markedly from 1989, and along with dry conditions and the extension of four-day cricket this enabled batsmen to make large scores and Graham Gooch became one of a handful of players to average over 100 in a first-class season. The County Championship was won by Middlesex. England defeated both New Zealand and India 1-0 in respective Test series.

Honours
County Championship - Middlesex CCC
NatWest Trophy - Lancashire CCC
Sunday League - Derbyshire CCC
Benson & Hedges Cup - Lancashire CCC
Minor Counties Championship - Hertfordshire
MCCA Knockout Trophy - Buckinghamshire
Second XI Championship - Sussex II 
Wisden - Mike Atherton, Mohammed Azharuddin, Alan Butcher, Desmond Haynes, Mark Waugh

Test series

New Zealand tour

India tour

County Championship

NatWest Trophy

Benson & Hedges Cup

Sunday League

Other tours

Zimbabwe tour
The Zimbabwe national cricket team made a short tour of England in May, playing two limited overs and three first-class matches against county opposition.

Sri Lanka tour

References

Annual reviews
 Playfair Cricket Annual 1991
 Wisden Cricketers' Almanack 1991

External links
 

 
English cricket seasons in the 20th century
English Cricket Season, 1990